Robert Burnaby (November 30, 1828 – January 10, 1878) was an English merchant, politician and civil servant in British Columbia, where he served as private secretary to Richard Clement Moody, the founder and first Lieutenant-Governor of British Columbia. Moody named Burnaby Lake, in British Columbia, after Burnaby, and the city of Burnaby was subsequently named after Burnaby, as were at least ten other urban and geographical features, including a mountain, Robert Burnaby Park, a Haida Gwaii Island, and a street in Vancouver.

Early life

Burnaby was born in Woodthorpe, Leicestershire. Before his appointment to the staff of Richard Clement Moody, he worked for the civil service in London, during which service he attracted the favour of Sir Edward Bulwer-Lytton.

Private secretary to Richard Clement Moody
On the strength of a recommendation by Sir Edward Bulwer-Lytton, Richard Clement Moody decided to hire Burnaby as his personal secretary. In this position, Burnaby contributed to the planning of the settlement of the towns of Queensborough, Hope and Yale. Burnaby also explored the area around Burnaby Lake, which Moody decided to name after him.

Within a year or so, he founded a commission trading business with his friend Edward Henderson, in Victoria. Due to high risk, speculation in a coal mine in Burrard Inlet that never materialized, and a recession, it folded in 1865. He then went into real estate and insurance. In 1862 he contended that he had a claim prior to that of the "Three Greenhorn Englishmen" to what is now known as the West End of Vancouver, but Judge Chartres Brew dismissed the documents he produced as forgeries, "obviously written by a liar or a knave."

Legislative Assembly of Vancouver Island
Soon after his arrival in Victoria, Burnaby ran for the Legislative Assembly. He was elected as the member from Esquimalt and Metchosin, and served for five years.

Burnaby helped found the Victoria Chamber of Commerce, and was president of the Amateur Dramatic Association of Victoria. The well-connected Burnaby was a close friend of many prominent figures in the region, including the Judges Matthew Baillie Begbie and Henry Pering Pellew Crease, gold commissioner Thomas Elwyn, and Richard Clement Moody.

Freemasonry
Burnaby was active in Freemasonry, and a key figure in its development in British Columbia. In 1860 Burnaby helped to found Victoria Lodge No. 1085, the first Masonic lodge in what is now British Columbia, and was elected its first Past Master. When a District Grand Lodge for British Columbia was formed in 1868, under the Grand Lodge of England, Burnaby headed it as District Grand Master. At first he opposed a plan put forward by lodges affiliated with the Scottish Grand Lodge to form an independent Grand Lodge, but seeing growing tension between English and Scottish lodges, he later agreed to put the matter to a general vote. Finding wide support, he tabled the motion to create the new Grand Lodge of BC on October 21, 1871. Burnaby refused the post of Grand Master due poor health, but was elected first Past Grand Master.

Settlements named after Burnaby
The most lasting contribution Burnaby made to British Columbia may have been to simply lend his name to its maps. When the area around Burnaby Lake, which Richard Clement Moody had named after Burnaby, was later incorporated, in 1892, the new municipality also chose the name Burnaby. An island and a narrows in Haida Gwaii are named for him, as well as a street, a hill, and a park in Burnaby itself. In total, at least eleven urban and geographical features in BC bear his name.

Later life
Burnaby's failing health lead to his retirement in 1869 and his return to England in 1874. He died in 1878.

References
History of Burnaby online pdf view from the Heritage Burnaby website
Robie L. Reid, Historical Notes and Biographical Sketches 1848 - 1935 "Bio of Robert Burnaby" at Grand Lodge BC & Yukon website
Madge Wolfenden, "Robert Burnaby" at Dictionary of Canadian Biography online, 2000
Tom Snyders with Jennifer O'Rourke, Namely Vancouver: A Hidden History of Vancouver Place Names (Vancouver: Arsenal Pulp Press, 2001)

Footnotes

Members of the Legislative Assembly of Vancouver Island
English explorers of North America
Explorers of British Columbia
Burnaby
English emigrants to pre-Confederation British Columbia
1828 births
1878 deaths